Sherrilyn Woodward (formerly Sherrilyn Kenyon; born December 11, 1965) is a bestselling US writer. Under her former married name, she wrote both urban fantasy and paranormal romance. She is best known for her Dark Hunter series. Under the pseudonym Kinley MacGregor she writes historical fiction with paranormal elements. Kenyon's novels have an "international following" with over 70 million copies in print in over 100 countries. Under both names, her books have appeared at the top of the New York Times, Publishers Weekly, and USA Today lists, and they are frequent bestsellers in Germany, Australia, and the United Kingdom.

Biography
Sherrilyn Woodward was born on 11 December 1965 in Columbus, Georgia. She married and had three children.

Accusations and divorce
On January 7, 2019, Woodward filed a lawsuit against her husband and his assistants, claiming they had poisoned her over a number of years in order to sabotage her health to his financial gain. After her husband filed for divorce in March 2018, the suit alleges that tests concluded her levels of lithium, tin, barium, thorium and other metals were at a dangerous level of toxicity, indicating that they had “systematically poisoned her since 2015". Her husband's statement about the lawsuit called her “a brilliant fiction writer who has made it apparent that she cannot discern between fiction and reality”.

Bibliography

Novels and short stories may be listed repeatedly because many of her series share the same fictional universe.

Written (mostly) as Sherrilyn Kenyon

Dark-Hunter Universe (combined) 
Each sub-set of the series is marked by the type of creatures the novel is about.

Dark Hunter Universe short stories 
 "Dragonswan"
 Dark Hunter Universe #1.5
 Available in the anthology Tapestry, published by Jove (2002);
 Reprinted singly by Berkley (2005)
 Reprinted in the anthology In Other Worlds, published by Penguin Group (2010)
 "The Beginning"
 Available in the back of Sins of the Night early print editions (St. Martin's Paperbacks, 2002)
 NOTE: This short story appears as a chapter in Acheron, Part I-Greece, 7382 BC
 "Phantom Lover"
 Dark Hunter Universe #3.5
 Dream Hunter #0.5
 Available for free on her website in 1999
 Available in the anthology Midnight Pleasures (St. Martin's Paperbacks, 2003)
 Available in the anthology Dark Bites (St. Martin's Press, Jan 21, 2014)
 "A Dark-Hunter Christmas" 
 Dark Hunter Universe #4.5
 Were-Hunter #0.5
 In the back of Dance with the Devil early print editions (St. Martin's Paperbacks, 2003)
 Available in The Dark-Hunter Companion
 Reprinted in Dark-Hunter: An Insider's Guide (Vook Inc., 2010)
 "Winter Born"
 Dark Hunter Universe #8.5
 Were-Hunter #1.5
 Available in the anthology Stroke of Midnight (St. Martin's Paperbacks, 2004)
 Available in the anthology Dark Bites (St. Martin's Press, Jan 21, 2014)
 "Second Chances"
 Dark Hunter Universe #
 Available in Exclusive Dark-Hunter Collectible Booklet (St. Martin's Paperbacks, 2005), free giveaway
 Reprinted in The Dark-Hunter Companion;
 Reprinted in Dark-Hunter: An Insider's Guide (Vook Inc., 2010)
 "A Hard Day's Night-Searcher"
 Dark Hunter Universe #10.5
 Available in the anthology My Big Fat Supernatural Wedding (St. Martin's Griffin, 2006)
 Available in the anthology Dark Bites (St. Martin's Press, Jan 21, 2014)
 "Until Death We Do Part"
 Dark Hunter Universe #12.5
 Available in the anthology Love At First Bite (St. Martin's Paperbacks, 2006)
 Available in the anthology Dark Bites (St. Martin's Press, Jan 21, 2014)
 "The Wager"
 Dark Hunter Universe #
 Lords Of Avalon #
 Note: 4 pages long
 Available in the anthology Elemental: The Tsunami Relief Anthology: Stories of Science Fiction and Fantasy (Tor Books, 2006) 
 "Fear the Darkness", free short story ebook (St. Martin's Press, 2007) 
 Dark Hunter Universe #14.5
 Reprinted in Dark-Hunter: An Insider's Guide (Vook Inc., 2010)
 Available in the anthology Dark Bites (St. Martin's Press, Jan 21, 2014)
 "Shadow of the Moon"
 Dark Hunter Universe #16.5
 Dream-Hunter #?
 Available in the anthology Dead After Dark (St. Martin's Press, 2008)
 Available in the anthology Dark Bites (St. Martin's Press, Jan 21, 2014)
 "Redemption"
 Dark Hunter Universe #24.5
 A bonus scene from The Guardian
 Free short story (Heroes and Heartbreakers.com, 2011)
 Available in the anthology Dark Bites (St. Martin's Press, Jan 21, 2014)
 "Where Angels Fear to Tread"
 Dark Hunter Universe #0.5
 Hellchaser #0.5
 Originally published in 1992
 Available in the anthology Blood Lite (Gallery Books, 2008)
 Reprinted in Dark-Hunter: An Insider's Guide (Vook Inc., 2010)
 Available in the anthology Dark Bites (St. Martin's Press, Jan 21, 2014)
 Dark Bites (St. Martin's Press, Jan 21, 2014) – A collection of the short stories/novellas that Kenyon has written for St. Martin's Press, featuring Fear the Darkness, with Nick as the lead, and updates on other characters. Available in print in mass market paperback.
 House of the Rising Son – Dark Hunter Universe #26.5. Dream-Hunter #5.5
 The story of Aricles & Bathymaas (more about them in Styxx's book)
 Phantom Lover – V'Aidan's story that was first in "Midnight Pleasures"
 Winter Born – Dante & Pandora (Were-Panthers) that was first in "Stroke of Midnight"
 A Dark-Hunter Christmas – Gallagher (Dark-Hunter) originally posted online
 Until Death Do We Part – originally published in "Love At First Bite" anthology
 A Hard Day's Night Searcher – originally published in "My Big Fat Supernatural Wedding" anthology
 Shadow of the Moon – (Fury the wolf) originally published in Dead After Dark
 Fear The Darkness – originally a digital download for fans. It is a little piece of Nick after his mother died.
 Where Angels Fear to Tread – originally published in the "Blood Lite" anthology
 Love Bytes – originally published in "Naughty or Nice"
 Santa Wears Spurs – originally published in All I Want for Christmas anthology. Written as Kinley MacGregor
 Redemption – A bonus scene from The Guardian

Dark-Hunter Universe (by series)

Were-Hunter  
 Night Play, (St. Martin's Paperbacks, 2004)
 Unleash the Night, (St. Martin's Paperbacks, 2005)
 Dark Side of the Moon (St. Martin's Press, 2006, reprinted by St. Martin's Paperbacks, 2007)(Hardcover , Paperback )
 Bad Moon Rising (St. Martin's Press, 2009, reprinted by St. Martin's Paperbacks, 2010) (Hardcover , Paperback )
 No Mercy (St. Martin's Press, 2010, reprinted by St. Martin's Paperbacks, 2011) (Hardcover , Paperback )
 Retribution (St. Martin's Press, 2011, reprinted by St. Martin's Paperbacks, Mar 27, 2012) (Hardcover , Paperback )
 The Guardian (St. Martin's Paperbacks, 2011)
 Son of No One (St. Martin's Press, 2014)
 Dragonbane (St. Martin's Press, 2015)
 Dragonmark(St Martin's Press, August 2, 2016)
 Dragonsworn (St. Martin's Press, August 4, 2017)

Dream-Hunter  
 The Dream-Hunter (St. Martin's Paperbacks, 2007)
 Upon the Midnight Clear (St. Martin's Paperback, 2007)
 Dream Chaser (St. Martin's Paperback, 2008)
 Dream Warrior (St. Martin's Press, 2009)
 The Guardian (St. Martin's Paperbacks, 2011)
 Shadow Fallen (St. Martin's Press, 2022) (ISBN 9781250773869)

Hellchaser/Hell-Hunter novels 

 Daemon's Angel, (Leisure, 1995) 
 Bad Moon Rising (St. Martin's Press, 2009, reprinted by St. Martin's Paperbacks, 2010) (Hardcover , Paperback )
 The Guardian (St. Martin's Paperbacks, 2011)
 Time Untime (St. Martin's Press, 2012)
 Son of No One (St. Martin's Press, 2014)
 Dragonbane (St. Martin's Press, 2015)
 Deadmen Walking (TOR, ?)
 Death Doesn't Bargain (TOR, ?)
 At Death's Door (TOR, ?)

Lords Of Avalon  

Notes: Begun as Kinley MacGregor. Continuing as Sherrilyn Kenyon. 
 Sword of Darkness, (2006)() (as Kinley MacGregor)
 Knight of Darkness, (2006) (as Kinley MacGregor)
 Son of No One (St. Martin's Press, 2014) (as Sherrilyn Kenyon) (Sherrilyn explained at a Q & A that the LoA book Darkness Within morphed into Son of No One.)
 Dragonbane (St. Martin's Press, 2015) (as Sherrilyn Kenyon)
 Dragonmark (St. Martin's Press, 2016) (as Sherrilyn Kenyon)
 Dragonsworn(St. Martin's Press, 2017) (as Sherrilyn Kenyon)
 Battleborn (St. Martin's Press, August 4, 2018) (as Sherrilyn Kenyon)

Deadman's Cross  
Part of three series: The Dark Hunter Universe, Hellchasers and Sea Wolves. They are historical fantasy.
 Deadmen Walking (TOR, 2017)
 Death Doesn't Bargain (TOR, May 15, 2018)
 At Death's Door (TOR, Sep, 2019)

Dark Hunter Universe - The Chronicles Of Nick series (young adult) 
The Chronicles Of Nick take place well before the first Dark Hunter novel (Fantasy Lover) and follows one of the series' main characters: Nick Gautier.
 Infinity (St. Martin's Press, 2010)
 Invincible (St. Martin's Griffin, 2011)
 Infamous (St. Martin's Griffin, 2012)
 Inferno (St. Martin's Griffin, 2013)
 Illusion (St. Martin's Griffin, 2014)
 Instinct (St. Martin's Griffin, 2015)
 Invision (St. Martin's Griffin, 2016)
 Intensity (Nemesis Publications, 2017)

Dark Hunter Universe - Shadows of Fire series (young adult) 
Shadows of Fire is a four book continuation of CON.  After this is finished there will be an as of yet untitled adult trilogy that will finish the story line.
 Heart of Venom (expected publication 2022)
 Will of Iron (expected publication 2023)
 Fist of Fire (expected publication 2024)
 Eye of Stone (expected publication 2025)

Dark Hunter Universe - extras

Audio books 
All books in the Dark Hunter series are available on Audio. (Macmillan Audio, Unabridged edition, as of June 30, 2014)

Supplements
 The Dark-Hunter Companion, co-author Alethea Kontis (St. Martin's Griffin, 2007)
 Dark-Hunter: An Insider's Guide, an enhanced ebook (Vook Inc., 2010)

Manga and graphic novels
 Lords of Avalon Graphic Novels:
 Sword of Darkness co-written by Robin Furth (Marvel)  (Hardcover , September 18, 2008)  (Paperback  ISBN August 12, 2009)
 Knight of Darkness written by Robin Furth (Marvel)  (Hardcover , September 9, 2009)
 The Dark Hunters Manga:
 The Dark Hunter: Vol. 1 (St. Martin's Griffin, July 7, 2009)
 The Dark Hunter: Vol. 2 (St. Martin's Griffin, March 2, 2010)
 The Dark Hunter: Vol. 3 (St. Martin's Griffin, September 28, 2010)
 The Dark Hunter: Vol. 4 (St. Martin's Griffin, March 1, 2011)

Comics 
 Sword of Darkness
 Sword of Darkness, Issue 1, Co-written by Robin Gillespie, Penciled by Tommy Ohtsuka, Lettered by Bill Tortolini  (Marvel, February 6, 2008) (UPC: 5960606156-00111, Variant Cover UPC: 5960606156-00121, Sketch Variant UPC: 5960606156-00131)
 Sword of Darkness, Issue 2, Co-written by Robin Furth, Penciled by Tommy Ohtsuka, Lettered by Bill Tortolini (Marvel, March 5, 2008) (UPC: 5960606156-00211)
 Sword of Darkness, Issue 3, Co-written by Robin Furth, Penciled by Tommy Ohtsuka, Lettered by Bill Tortolini (Marvel, April 2, 2008) (UPC: 5960606156-00311)
 Sword of Darkness, Issue 4, Written by Robin Furth, Penciled by Tommy Ohtsuka, Lettered by Bill Tortolini (Marvel, May 7, 2008) (UPC: 5960606156-00411)
 Sword of Darkness, Issue 5, Written by Robin Furth, Inked by Tommy Ohtsuka, Colored by Guru-eFX, Lettered by Bill Tortolini (Marvel, June 4, 2008) (UPC: 5960606156-00511)
 Sword of Darkness, Issue 6, Written by Robin Furth, Inked by Tommy Ohtsuka, Colored by Guru-eFX, Lettered by Bill Tortolini (Marvel, July 2, 2008) (UPC: 5960606156-00611)
 Knight of Darkness
 Knight of Darkness, Issue 1, Written by Robin Furth, Inked by Tommy Ohtsuka, Colored by Jana Schirmer, Lettered by Bill Tortolini (Marvel, December 3, 2008) (UPC: 5960606389-00111)
 Knight of Darkness, Issue 2, Written by Robin Furth, Inked by Tommy Ohtsuka, Colored by Jana Schirmer, Lettered by Bill Tortolini (Marvel, December 24, 2008) (UPC: 5960606389-00211)
 Knight of Darkness, Issue 3, Written by Robin Furth, Inked by Tommy Ohtsuka, Colored by Chris Sotomayor, Lettered by Bill Tortolini (Marvel, January 14, 2009) (UPC: 5960606389-00311)
 Knight of Darkness, Issue 4, Written by Robin Furth, Inked by Tommy Ohtsuka, Colored by Chris Sotomayor, Lettered by Bill Tortolini (Marvel, February 25, 2009) (UPC: 5960606389-00411)
 Knight of Darkness, Issue 5, Written by Robin Furth, Inked by Tommy Ohtsuka, Colored by Chris Sotomayor, Lettered by Bill Tortolini (Marvel, April 15, 2009) (UPC: 5960606389-00511)
 Knight of Darkness, Issue 6, Written by Robin Furth, Inked by Tommy Ohtsuka, Colored by Chris Sotomayor, Lettered by Bill Tortolini (Marvel, May 28, 2009) (UPC: 5960606389-00611)

Omnibuses and boxed sets
Night Pleasures and Night Embrace (St. Martin's Griffin, September 29, 2005)
The Dark-Hunter Novels Boxed Set (Night Pleasures, Night Embrace, and Dance with the Devil) (St. Martin's Paperbacks, October 3, 2006)
The Dark-Hunter Novels Boxed Set (Night Pleasures, Night Embrace, Dance with the Devil, Kiss of the Night, and Night Play) (St. Martin's Paperbacks, September 28, 2010)

B.A.D. (Bureau of American Defense) Agency series

Novels
Bad Attitude, (Pocket Books, June 27, 2006) (Hardcover , Paperback )
Phantom in the Night, co-author Dianna Love (Pocket Star Books, June 10, 2008)
Whispered Lies, co-author Dianna Love (Pocket Books, May 12, 2009)
Silent Truth, co-author Dianna Love (Pocket Books, April 20, 2010)

Short stories
 BAD to the Bone, in the anthology Big Guns Out of Uniform (2005)
 Captivated By You, in the anthology Tie Me Up, Tie Me Down: Three Tales of Erotic Romance (2005)
 Turn Up the Heat, in the anthology Playing Easy to Get (Pocket, 2006)
 Just Bad Enough, short story, co-author Dianna Love, in anthology Deadly Promises (Pocket Star, 2010)
 BAD Mission, short story in the anthology Thriller 3: Love is Murder (Mira, May 29, 2012)

Omnibuses
 Born to Be B.A.D., a reprint of the BAD stories (BAD to the Bone and 'Captivated' by You) PLUS a new short story called One BAD Night (Pocket Books, August 30, 2005)
 A B.A.D. Collection includes eBooks of Phantom in the Night, Whispered Lies, Silent Truth, and an excerpt from Alterant (Pocket Books, July 26, 2011)

The League series  
The League series is divided into two generations. Generation 1 is Nemesis Rising. Generation 2 is Nemesis Legacy. This series combines the two to tell a story. It is recommended that you read them in the order listed below.

Combined reading order 
 Born of Night: The League - Nemesis Rising (St. Martin's Press, Oct 2009)
 Born of Fire (St. Martin's Press, Nov 2009)
 Born of Ice (St. Martin's Press, Dec 2009)
 Fire and Ice (short story) in the anthology Man of My Dreams, published by Penguin Group US (2004); re-written & re-released in the anthology In Other World, published by Penguin Group (2010)
 Born of Shadows (Grand Central Publishing, April 2011)
 Born of Silence (Grand Central Publishing, May 2012)
 Cloak & Silence (E-book published independently; CreateSpace Independent Publishing Platform April 2013)
 Born of Fury (St. Martin's Press, July 2014)
 Born of Defiance (St. Martin's Press, May 2015) 
 Born of Betrayal (St. Martin's Press, November 2015) 
 Born of Legend (St. Martin's Press, May 2016) 
 Born of Vengeance (St. Martin's Press, May 2017) 
 Born of Trouble (St. Martin's Press, December 2019) 
 Born of Darkness (St. Martin's Press, 2019)

Nemesis Rising

 Born of Night (St. Martin's Press, Oct 2009)
 Born of Fire (St. Martin's Press, Nov 2009)
 Born of Shadows (Grand Central Publishing, April 2011)
 Born of Silence (Grand Central Publishing, May 2012)
 Cloak & Silence (E-book published independently; CreateSpace Independent Publishing Platform April 2013)
 Born of Fury (St. Martin's Press, July 2014)
 Born of Defiance (St. Martin's Press, May 2015) 
 Born of Betrayal (St. Martin's Press, November 2015) 
 Born of Legend (St. Martin's Press, May 2016)  
 Born of Vengeance (St. Martin's Press, May 2017) 
 Born of Trouble (St. Martin's Press, December 2019) 
 Born of Darkness (St. Martin's Press, 2019)

Nemesis Legacy
 Born of Ice (St. Martin's Press, Dec 2009)
 Fire and Ice (short story) in the anthology Man of My Dreams, published by Penguin Group US (2004); re-written & re-released in the anthology In Other World, published by Penguin Group (2010)

Nemesis Dynasty
Young adult spin-off series.

 Born of Rebellion (Coming Soon?)

Belador
The first four novels in this series are co-authored with Dianna Love.  Later novels will be written solely by Dianna.

Novels
 Blood Trinity (Pocket Books, Oct, 2010)
 Alterant (Pocket Books, Sept, 2011)
 The Curse (Pocket Books, Sept, 2012)
 Rise of the Gryphon (Pocket Books, July, 2013)

Short story
 Fire Bound, free e-short story (Pocket After Dark, 2011)

Silent Swans series
 The Cecilian Swan (Coming soon)
 Swans of Feather (Coming soon)
 War of the Swans (Coming soon)

Nevermore series
 Insurrection (Mighty Barnacle, LLC, 2017)
 Omega Rising (Coming soon)
 Crimson Dawn (Coming soon)
 Midnight's Last Gleaming (Coming soon)

Other works

Novels 
 Daemon's Angel (Leisure Books, 1995)

Novellas
 Love Bytes, in the anthology Naughty or Nice (St. Martin's Press, 2000)
 Knightly Dreams, in the anthology What Dreams May Come (Penguin Group, 2005)

Essays
 "The Search of Spike's Balls", in Seven Seasons of Buffy edited by Ben Bella
 "Parting Gifts", in Five Seasons of Angel edited by Glenn Yeffeth

Non-fiction
 The Writer's Guide to Everyday Life in the Middle Ages, (Writer's Digest, 1995)
 The Writer's Complete Fantasy Reference: An Indispensable Compendium of Myth and Magic, (Writer's Digest, 2000)
 The Writer's Digest Character Naming Sourcebook, with Hal Blythe and Charlie Sweet
 The Writer's Digest Character Naming Sourcebook, 2nd ed.

Written (mostly) as Kinley MacGregor
Published by Avon (HarperCollins Publishers) unless noted otherwise. Some of these appear in multiples because they happen in the same universe.

Lords Of Avalon 
 Sword Of Darkness (Part of the Dark-Hunter Universe)
 Knight Of Darkness (Part of the Dark-Hunter Universe)

The Sea Wolves series
 Master of Seduction, (2000)
 A Pirate of Her Own, (2004)
 Deadmen Walking (2017) *As Sherrilyn Kenyon
 Death Doesn't Bargain *As Sherrilyn Kenyon
 At Death's Door *As Sherrilyn Kenyon

Brotherhood of the Sword series 
Includes the entire MacAllister's Series.
 Master of Desire, (2001)
 Claiming the Highlander, (2002) 
 Born in Sin, (2003)
 Taming the Scotsman, (2003)
 A Dark Champion, (2004)
 Return of the Warrior, (2005)
 The Warrior, (2007)
 Midsummer's Knight, in the anthology Where's My Hero? (2003)

The MacAllisters series
 Master of Desire, (2001)
 Claiming the Highlander, (2002)
 Born in Sin, (2003)
 Taming the Scotsman, (2003)
 The Warrior, (2007)

Other novellas
 Santa Wears Spurs, in the anthology All I Want for Christmas (St. Martin's Press, 1999)

Awards
Sherrilyn McQueen has received numerous nominations and awards both under her married name Sherrilyn Kenyon and as Kinley MacGregor.

2001 and earlier

Maggie Award of Excellence
MARA Award
Holt Medallion
Heart Rate Reviews Reviewer's Choice Award
Amazon.com's Hot 100
Amazon.com's Movers & Shakers
Amazon.com's Best Seller for 2001
RT Kiss Award
Fool For Love
Affaire de Coeur Reader's Choice
Sapphire Award
RT Reviewer's Choice Awards

2002

 Top Ten Books of the Year from RWA (Romance Writer's Association) – Fantasy Lover
 Prism
 Best Fantasy – Fantasy Lover
 Best Light Paranormal – Night Pleasures
 Night Pleasures and Fantasy Lover were finalists in the Aspen Gold contest.
 Night Pleasures and Fantasy Lover were finalists in the GRW Maggie Award.
 Night Pleasures won the HOLT Medallion.
 PEARL (Paranormal Excellence Award in Romantic Literature) (2002)
 Best Shape-Shifter – Night Pleasures
 Best Fantasy/Magical – Fantasy Lover
 Best Novella or Short Story – Dragonswan
 Best Anthology – Tapestry, with Madeline Hunter, Sherrilyn Kenyon, Lynn Kurland, Karen Marie Moning
 Best Overall Paranormal, Honorable Mention – Fantasy Lover
 Night Pleasures and Fantasy Lover are double finalists in the Holt Medallion Award.
 RIO (Reviewers International Organization) (20023)
 Favorite Anthology – Tapestry
 Favorite Paranormal, Honorable Mention – Fantasy Lover
Laurel Wreath Award for Night Pleasures
Love Romances 2002 Golden Rose Reader Choice Awards Winner:
Best Historical Romance – Claiming the Highlander
Best Paranormal Romance (Honorable Mention) – Fantasy Lover
Best Novella (Honorable Mention) – Dragonswan
Best Romanctic Anthology (Honorable Mention) – Tapestry
Best Medieval Romance – Claiming the Highlander
Best Time Travel (Honorable Mention) – Dragonswan
Best Romantic Sci-Fi Fantasy – Fantasy Lover

 RT Booklovers Reviewer's Choice
 Best Historical Anthology, Nominee – Tapestry 
 Best Vampire Romance – Night Pleasures
 Best Scottish Historical Romance – Claiming the Highlander
2002 RBL Hughie Awards:

Best Anthology – Tapestry 
Best New to You Author – Sherrilyn Kenyon/Kinley MacGregor
Favorite Secondary Character (Male) Talon (Night Pleasures)
Funniest Scene: The handcuffs scene (Night Pleasures)
Best Line or Quote – "Be kind to Dragonswans, for thou art gorgeous when naked and taste good with Cool Whip." (Dragonswan)
Best Medieval Historical Romance – Claiming the Highlander

2003–2004

 Prism (2004)
 Best Dark Paranormal – Dance with the Devil
 Best Light Paranormal – Night Embrace
 RIO (Reviewers International Organization) (2003)
 Favorite Paranormal – Dance With The Devil
 The Golden Quill for Best Paranormal, Dance with the Devil
 The Bookseller's Best Award for Born in Sin, Best Long Historical and Dance with the Devil for Best Paranormal (Night Embrace was second)
Night Embrace won the Contemporary category of the Scarlet Letter award and is named Grand Champion of all the winners.
Night Embrace and Born in Sin won the HOLT Medallion
Night Embrace won the Laurie
Born in Sin won the Beacon for Best Historical
Born in Sin won the Yellow Rose for Best Historical
Sapphires for Dance with the Devil and "Phantom Lover".
Love Romances 2003 Golden Rose Reader Choice Awards Winner:
Born In Sin – Kinley MacGregor – Best Historical Romance
Dance With The Devil – Sherrilyn Kenyon – Best Paranormal Romance
Dance With The Devil – Sherrilyn Kenyon – Best Vampire Romance
Dance With The Devil – Sherrilyn Kenyon – Best Book Cover- Artist Unknown
"Phantom Lover" (Midnight Pleasures) – Sherrilyn Kenyon – Best Novella
Night Embrace – Sherrilyn Kenyon- Honorable Mention Best Shapeshifter Romance

 2003 RBL Hughie Awards:
Best Scottish Historical Romance – Born In Sin by Kinley MacGregor
Best Paranormal Romance (time travel, futuristic, fantasy, etc.) Dance With The Devil by Sherrilyn Kenyon
Best Anthology – Midnight Pleasures by Sherrilyn Kenyon, Amanda Ashley, Maggie Shayne, and Rhonda Thompson and Where's My Hero? by Lisa Kleypas, Julia Quinn, and Kinley MacGregor
Best Cover – Dance With The Devil by Sherrilyn Kenyon
Best Author – Sherrilyn Kenyon (Kinley MacGregor)
Favorite Secondary Character (Male) – Acheron (Dark Hunter Series by Sherrilyn Kenyon)
Favorite Secondary Character (Female) – Simi, the Charonte Demon (Dance With The Devil by Sherrilyn Kenyon)
Funniest Scene – Sin meeting the MacAllister brothers after he marries Callie (Born In Sin by Kinley MacGregor)
Best Line or Quote – "You know, Sunshine, you need to find a man like that to marry. Someone so well-hung that even after three or four kids, he'd still be wall to wall." (Night Embrace by Sherrilyn Kenyon)

Night Pleasures won the Laurel Wreath Award with Fantasy Lover coming in a close second
 PEARL (Paranormal Excellence Award in Romantic Literature) (2003)
 Best Shape-Shifter, Honorable Mention – Dance With The Devil
 Best Novella or Short Story, Honorable Mention – "Phantom Lover"
 Best Anthology, Honorable Mention – Midnight Pleasures, with Sherrilyn Kenyon, Amanda Ashley, Maggie Shayne, and Rhonda Thompson
 Favorite Overall Paranormal, Honorable Mention – Dance With the Devil

2005–2006
 Darrell Awards (2006)
 Best Novel – Sins of the Night
 RIO (Reviewers International Organization) (2005)
 Favorite Paranormal – Seize the Night
 PEARL (Paranormal Excellence Award in Romantic Literature) (2005)
 Best Paranormal Over All – Sins of the Night
 Best Paranormal Over All, Honorable Mention – Unleash the Night
 Best Anthology – What Dreams May Come
 Best Erotic – Unleash the Night
 Best Shapeshifter – Sins of the Night
Sins of the Night was #5 on Amazon.com's bestselling books of 2005. Fantasy Lover and Night Pleasures are #6 and #7 respectively for the best of the decade so far.
Love Romances 2005 Golden Rose Reader Choice Awards Winner:
 Best Historical – A Dark Champion – Kinley MacGregor
 Best Novella – Winter Born – Sherrilyn Kenyon
 Best Vampire – Seize the Night – Sherrilyn Kenyon
 Best Shapeshifter – Night Play – Sherrilyn Kenyon
 Best Couple – Vane & Bride in Night Play – Sherrilyn Kenyon
 Best Cover – Kiss of the Night – Sherrilyn Kenyon

2007
Devil May Cry was #2 on 'New York Times Best Sellers Hardcover Fiction List (week ended August 11, 2007)

2010
No Mercy on the New York Times Best Sellers Hardcover Fiction List

References

External links
 
 

American fantasy writers
American romantic fiction writers
American women novelists
Novelists from Tennessee
Writers from Columbus, Georgia
1965 births
Living people
21st-century American novelists
Women science fiction and fantasy writers
Women romantic fiction writers
21st-century American women writers
Novelists from Georgia (U.S. state)
Pseudonymous women writers
21st-century pseudonymous writers
20th-century pseudonymous writers